Live at the Marquee is an album by British Afro rock band Osibisa recorded live at The Marquee Club, London, April 5, 1983 and released in 1984 by Premier Records under catalog #1035. The concert has been issued as VHS in 1990 by Media 7 under the title Warrior and as DVD in 2003 by Umbrella Music under the title The Marquee 25th Anniversary presents Osibisa in Concert.

Track listing

DVD track listing
The same tracks of the show but with some different titles

Fire
Life
Ayioko
Paper/Match 
Woyaya
Gong Gong
Too Much 
Happy Children 
Warrior 
Sunshine Day

Personnel
Sol Amarfio: drums
Kari Bannerman: guitar
Gregg Brown: bass, vocals
Tony Etoria: guitar
Teddy Osei: saxophone, flute, percussion, vocals 
Daku "Potato" Adams: congas
Errol Reid: keyboards
Frank Tontoh: drums
Mac Tontoh: trumpet

Production
Recorded live at The Marquee Club, London, April 5, 1983
Production (Original): Phillip Goodhand-Tait, Maurice Bacon, Kate & Derek Burbidge
Production (DVD): Jeff Harrison, Gil Matthews
Direction: Don Coutts
Cameras: Dave Swan, Barrie Dodd, Kevan Debonnaire, Badger
Vision Mixer: Pam Hicks
Unit Manager: Dick Allott
Production Manager: Lucy Ogilvie
Video Editor: Alan Goddard
Production Assistant: Heather Staines
Recording: Doug Bennett
Mixing: Smudger
Lighting: Entec Ltd.
Thanks: Jack Barrie, Nigel Hutchins, Harold & Barbara Pendleton
DVD Studio: Eskimo Productions
Graphic Designer: Tim Webster
A Zoetrope Ltd., Trilion Pictures Ltd. and Marque Entertainment Production 1983
Released in 2004 by Umbrella Music
Length: 53:48 min 
Resolution: 640 x 480 pixels

References
New Musical Express  http://www.nme.com/nme-video/youtube/id/DtMUyvwejNA
Amazon  https://www.amazon.co.uk/s/ref=nb_sb_noss?url=node%3D501888&field-keywords=osibisa&x=17&y=15 and https://www.amazon.com/Osibisa-Live/dp/B000KJT7WS/ref=sr_1_3?s=movies-tv&ie=UTF8&qid=1314912643&sr=1-3
Progarchives  http://www.progarchives.com/album.asp?id=11377
Ver La Musica  http://verlamusica.blogspot.com/2011/04/osibisa-live-at-marquee-1983-2004.html

1984 live albums
Osibisa albums
Live albums recorded at The Marquee Club